Serovo is a municipal settlement in Kurortny District of the federal city of St. Petersburg, Russia, located on the Karelian Isthmus, on the northern shore of the Gulf of Finland, where the Roshchinka River (Finnish: Vammeljoki) empties into the gulf. Population:

References

Municipal settlements under jurisdiction of Saint Petersburg
Kurortny District
Karelian Isthmus